Ringel is a surname. Notable people with the surname include:

Erwin Ringel (1921–1994), Austrian psychiatrist and neurologist who dedicated his life to suicide prevention
Faye Ringel, former American professor of humanities at the United States Coast Guard Academy and an author
Gerhard Ringel (1919–2008), German mathematician
Jean-Désiré Ringel d'Illzach (1849–1916), French sculptor and engraver
Julius Ringel (1889–1967), Austrian-born German General of Mountain Troops (General der Gebirgstruppen)

See also
Ringel–Hall algebra, generalization of the Hall algebra, studied by Claus Michael Ringel (1990)